The 2014 Angola 2nd Division Basketball Championship (2nd edition), was a basketball tournament  held in Kuito, Bié, Angola, from September 17 to 25, 2014. The tournament, organized by the Angolan Basketball Federation, qualified the two top teams for the 2014–15 BIC Basket and was contested by 4 clubs, that played in a double round robin system followed by the knock-out stages (semis and final).
 
The tournament was won by Progresso do Sambizanga.

Teams
 Casa do Pessoal do Porto do Lobito
 Marinha de Guerra de Angola
 Sporting Clube do Bié
 Progresso do Sambizanga

Preliminary rounds

Semi-finals

Bronze medal match

Final

Final standings

See also
 2014–15 BIC Basket

References

External links 
 2013 FIBA Africa Champions Cup for Women Official Website
 

2014
Second